The 2013 Viccourt Cup was a professional tennis tournament played on outdoor hard courts. It was the second edition of the tournament which was part of the 2013 ITF Women's Circuit, offering a total of $75,000 in prize money. It took place in Donetsk, Ukraine, on 29 July–3 August 2013.

Singles entrants

Seeds 

 1 Rankings as of 22 July 2013

Other entrants 
The following players received wildcards into the singles main draw:
  Valentyna Ivakhnenko
  Kateryna Kozlova
  Ganna Poznikhirenko
  Marianna Zakarlyuk

The following players received entry from the qualifying draw:
  Anhelina Kalinina
  Kamila Kerimbayeva
  Lesley Kerkhove
  Anastasiya Vasylyeva

Champions

Women's singles 

  Elina Svitolina def.  Tímea Babos 3–6, 6–2, 7–6(11–9)

Women's doubles 

  Yuliya Beygelzimer /  Renata Voráčová def.  Vesna Dolonc /  Alexandra Panova 6–1, 6–4

External links 
 Official website 
 2013 Viccourt Cup at ITFtennis.com

2013 ITF Women's Circuit
2013
2013 in Ukrainian sport